All My Loved Ones is a 1999 Czech-language film directed by Matej Mináč. It was an international co-production between Poland, the Czech Republic and Slovakia. It was Slovakia's official Best Foreign Language Film submission at the 72nd Academy Awards, but did not manage to receive a nomination.

Plot
It is the story of an upwardly-mobile Jewish-Czech family before Nazi invasion of Czechoslovakia. After initial denial about the looming danger, the family is unable to find a way out of the country upon realizing the reality of the imminent Nazi threat. An uncle in the family meets Nicholas Winton, the (real life) British humanitarian who, just before the start of the Second World War, organized the rescue of several hundred Jewish children from German-occupied Czechoslovakia and likely death in the Holocaust. The operation was later known as the Czech Kindertransport. The storyline focuses heavily on Silberstein family members, with Nicholas Winton (portrayed by Rupert Graves) appearing briefly in key scenes near the end of the film.

Development
Mináč got the idea for "a film about what preceded the war from the perspective of a child" from stories recounted by his mother. For further inspiration, he visited Prague's Jewish Museum and read Vera Gissing's Pearls of My Childhood, which briefly mentioned Nicholas Winton rescuing hundreds of children before the war. From this Mináč wrote a treatment. When he asked Alice Klimova to translate the treatment into English, she informed him that she was one of the rescued children and that Winton was still alive. After meeting him, Mináč became determined to not only make his original film idea, but also to make the documentary The Power of Good: Nicholas Winton.

Cast
 Rupert Graves as Nicholas Winton
 Josef Abrhám as Jakub Silberstein
 Jiří Bartoška as Samuel
 Libuse Safránková as Irma
 Hanna Dunowska as Eva Marie
 Krzysztof Kolberger as Leo
 Tereza Brodská as Hedvika
 Krzysztof Kowalewski as Rous
 Marián Labuda as Helmut Spitzer
 Agnieszka Wagner as Anna
 Jirí Pecha as Amavite Puel
 Grazyna Wolszczak as Angelika
 Ondrej Vetchý as Max
 Brano Holicek as David
 Lucia Culkova as Sosa

References

External links

1999 films
1990s war drama films
Holocaust films
1990s Czech-language films
Kindertransport
Czech war drama films
Polish war drama films
Czech Lion Awards winners (films)
1999 drama films
Czech World War II films
Polish World War II films
Slovak World War II films
Slovak war drama films